Rabenau may refer to two places in Germany:

Rabenau, Saxony
Rabenau, Hesse